Vance Matthew "Vinnie" Miller (born August 16, 1997) is an American professional stock car racing driver. He last competed part-time in the NASCAR Xfinity Series, driving the No. 78 Chevrolet Camaro/Toyota Supra for B. J. McLeod Motorsports.

He has previously driven for JD Motorsports in the Xfinity Series, Bolen Motorsports in the NASCAR Camping World Truck Series, MDM Motorsports in the K&N Pro Series East and the ARCA Racing Series, and Wauters Motorsports in the CARS Super Late Model Tour.

Racing career

Early years
After starting racing with quarter midgets at age five, Miller spent his formative years racing on Michigan short tracks, some being the same as Monster Energy NASCAR Cup Series drivers Brad Keselowski and Erik Jones. He focused on Owosso Speedway, driving late models. Miller also competed in super late models, Pro All Stars Series, New Smyrna Speedway's Speedweeks and the 602 Tour.

In 2015, he signed with Wauters Motorsports to run super late models in the CARS Super Series, PASS Late Model Series and the Southern Super Series. During the CARS series, Miller split his time between Wauters and Crooks Racing, scoring a best finish of twelfth at Concord Speedway with Crooks. He drove for his own team in 2016, only finishing one of his five CARS attempts.

Developmental series
Miller signed with MDM Motorsports for a limited ARCA Racing Series schedule in 2017. The pairing came about through Miller's agent, whom he raced with in Michigan for five years. In six races he scored four top tens, two coming on short tracks and two coming on superspeedways. During his home race at Michigan International Speedway, he would start from the front row and lead laps for the first time in ARCA competition, leading six in total before being involved in an accident with Riley Herbst while the two were racing for the lead. Miller also competed in six races for MDM in the NASCAR K&N Pro Series East, scoring top tens in both races at South Boston Speedway.

NASCAR

Miller signed with JD Motorsports for his NASCAR debut, which would come in the Xfinity Series in the No. 0 car replacing regular driver Garrett Smithley at Chicagoland Speedway. He finished 29th, seven laps down. Later on, Miller signed with Bolen Motorsports to make his Camping World Truck Series debut at Talladega Superspeedway. He avoided a last-lap wreck to score a seventh-place finish, tying the best finish for the team up to that point.

On November 28, 2017, it was announced that Miller would become the full-time driver of JD Motorsports' No. 01 entry in 2018, inheriting the ride driven by Harrison Rhodes in 2017. 

On September 22, 2018, it was announced that Miller left JD Motorsports and would join the No. 78 entry for B. J. McLeod Motorsports for the remaining six races of the season and a full schedule in 2019. The deal for 2019 had been worked out during the summer, and JDM team owner Johnny Davis granted Miller a release from his team to get acclimated to the BJMM team earlier. Late in his rookie season, Miller highlighted road course racing as something he would like to improve at for his sophomore season. Miller would also drive the team's No. 5 and 99 cars over the next two years,

Personal life
Miller grew up residing in the town of Metamora, Michigan, and graduated from Brandon High School in the nearby town of Ortonville. He is an avid outdoorsman and enjoys hunting, fishing, boating, and snowmobiling when away from the racetrack. He also enjoys golfing and diving. He has stated that, were he not a race car driver, he would like to own an aquarium shop.

He credits his late grandfather Vance Weedon and his grandmother Julie Weedon for getting him involved in racing and for being the biggest influences on his life.

He currently resides near the town of Statesville, North Carolina, where he is opening his own Aquatics shop, under the name River & Reef Aquatics.

Motorsports career results

NASCAR
(key) (Bold – Pole position awarded by qualifying time. Italics – Pole position earned by points standings or practice time. * – Most laps led.)

Xfinity Series

Camping World Truck Series

K&N Pro Series East

 Season still in progress
 Ineligible for series points

ARCA Racing Series
(key) (Bold – Pole position awarded by qualifying time. Italics – Pole position earned by points standings or practice time. * – Most laps led.)

References

External links

 
 

NASCAR drivers
1997 births
Living people
Racing drivers from Michigan
ARCA Menards Series drivers
People from Lapeer County, Michigan
Sportspeople from Metro Detroit